Wahjoe Sardono (EYD: Wahyu Sardono, 30 September 1951 – 30 December 2001), commonly called as Dono Warkop, was an Indonesian actor, comedian and lecturer who was a member of the Warkop group.

Career
Dono was born and raised in Delanggu, Klaten, Central Java. While attending SMA Negeri 3 Surakarta, he had to ride a bicycle for tens of kilometers round-trip from Klaten to Solo. While in high school, Dono's leadership talent was already seen with him being trusted to serve as chairman of student council (OSIS).

Dono then studied at the University of Indonesia majoring in sociology. While studying, Dono was already actively working in several newspapers, including Tribune and Salemba, mainly as a caricaturist. Both print media stopped publishing in 1974. Dono then joined the Warung Kopi Prambors group, which was founded a year earlier with Kasino, Indro and Nanu. They fill the radio show that is broadcast every Thursday night.

Dono was a member of the University of Indonesia Nature Lovers Student Group (Mapala UI) with Kasino and Nanu. Therefore, in several Warkop movie, references to their activities as nature lovers often appear.

Dono's teaching career as a lecturer began when he became an assistant to Selo Soemardjan and he often served as an assistant to handle group lectures together with Paulus Wirutomo. Dono has appeared several times as a speaker in public lectures if Prof. Soemardjan was unable to attend. Not all students can become assistants to Prof. Soemardjan at that time, and Dono could be said to be one of the bright and accomplished students. During his time as a lecturer, Dono was known as a firm and disciplined figure. Two of his colleagues in the Warkop group, Nanu and Rudy Badil, had been students taught by Dono and coincidentally both of them did not pass Dono's class, especially Nanu, who according to Dono's notes was often absent from class.

Dono was also a novelist. Until his death in 2001, he had written five books with four of them taking the storyline of a student's journey. His first novel was Balada Paijo which was published in 1987. In 2001, Dono wrote his last novel entitled Senggol Kanan Senggol Kiri. However, for one reason, Dono's last novel was published in 2009 or eight years after Dono died. In this book, Dono leaves the theme of student life and takes the theme of an employee's household problems.

Family
Dono met his future wife, Titi Kusumawardhani, during the orientation period at the Faculty of Social Sciences, University of Indonesia. When Dono was in junior high school, his family played jailangkung and asked who Dono's future wife would be. The spirit in Jalangkung then said the name of Dono's mate was Titi Kusumawardhani from Madiun. Several years later the jailangkung prediction proved to be true. Dono and Titi then married in 1977 and had three children, namely Andika Aria Sena, Damar Canggih Wicaksono dan Satrio Sarwo Trengginas. Titi died in 1997 due to breast cancer.

Death
Dono died on 30 December 2001 at the Santo Carolus Hospital due to a tumor in the buttocks that had spread to end-stage lung cancer and attacked the liver. Dono's body was buried at the Tanah Kusir public cemetery, Jakarta in the next day.

Dono as a character in the movie
At first, Dono played the character of Slamet, which is a depiction of an innocent Javanese man. He started playing this character in radio broadcasts. When he first became a film actor, Dono continued to play this character in the first three film titles: Mana Tahaaan..., Gengsi Dong and GeEr - Gede Rasa. It was revealed in Gengsi Dong thats Slamet's full name is Raden Mas Ngabei Slamet Condrowirawatikto Edi Pranoto Joyosentiko Mangundirjo Kusumo.

After the production of Warkop was taken over by Parkit Film, then Dono played the character "Dono" who is described as always having bad luck in everyday life but always lucky in terms of attracting the charm of beautiful women. He also got the nickname "The Bemo" because of his bemo-like face. Dono himself once said in an interview in 1995 that "if the character has too much bad luck maybe no one will watch my film, that's why I'm always paired with beautiful actresses".

Bibliography
 Balada Paijo (1987)
 Cemara-Cemara Kampus (1988)
 Bila Satpam Bercinta (1999)
 Dua Batang Ilalang (1999)
 Senggol Kiri Senggol Kanan (2009)

Filmography

Film
As actor

As producer

TV series

In popular culture
 In Warkop DKI Reborn: Jangkrik Boss! Part 1 and Warkop DKI Reborn: Jangkrik Boss! Part 2, Dono played by Abimana Aryasatya.
 In Warkop DKI Reborn 3 and Warkop DKI Reborn 4, Dono played by Aliando Syarief.

References

External links

1951 births
2001 deaths
Deaths from cancer in Indonesia
People from Klaten Regency
Javanese people
University of Indonesia alumni
Academic staff of the University of Indonesia
Indonesian sociologists
Indonesian male comedians
Indonesian comedians
Indonesian male film actors
Indonesian male television actors
Indonesian male novelists
Indonesian male writers
Indonesian Muslims